Love, Loss, Hope, Repeat is an album by the band Carbon Leaf on the Vanguard Records label. Recording for the album started in 2004 and it was released on September 12, 2006.

Track listing

Release week: Billboard chart performance
Top New Artists Chart: 3
Independent Chart: 12
Internet Chart: 14
Top Current Albums Chart: 170

Notes 

2006 albums
Carbon Leaf albums